The 1887–88 season is the 14th season of competitive football by Rangers.

Overview
Rangers played a total matches during the 1887–88 season.

Results
All results are written with Rangers' score first.

Scottish Cup

See also
 1887–88 in Scottish football
 1887–88 Scottish Cup

External links
1887–88 Rangers F.C.Results

Rangers F.C. seasons
Rangers